The Mascot Hall of Fame, formally "The Mascot Hall of Fame Interactive Children's Museum", is a hall of fame for North American sports mascots. It was founded by David Raymond, who was the original Phillie Phanatic from 1978 to 1993. It was founded as an online-only hall, with an induction ceremony taking place each year in Philadelphia, Pennsylvania.  However, in September 2014, Raymond's mascot company signed a memorandum of understanding with the City of Whiting, Indiana, to develop a permanent Mascot Hall of Fame on the south shore of Lake Michigan. The museum opened December 26, 2018.

Each year (beginning in 2005), mascots are elected into the Mascot Hall of Fame by the voting membership and an executive committee made up of performers, sports executives, and other individuals intimate with the mascot community. The mascots go through a nomination process that ends with the Executive Committee selecting six finalist in each category to be placed on the ballot for consideration. There is a public online vote that contributes a percentage of the final tally.  In 2006, the Hall added a separate class to honor college mascots.

The mission of the Mascot Hall of Fame is to honor mascot performers, performances, and programs that have positively affected their communities.  The Mascot Hall of Fame has also partnered with the Boys and Girls Clubs and holds an online auction contributing to that cause.  The main bulk of the items up for auction are pieces of signed sports memorabilia donated by professional sports teams around the nation.

To be eligible for the Mascot Hall of Fame, a mascot must have existed for a minimum of 10 years. They must also impact both their sport and community, inspire their fans, and consistently give memorable and groundbreaking performances.

Inductees

References

External links
Mascot Hall of Fame

Sports halls of fame
Halls of fame in Indiana
Museums established in 2005
Whiting, Indiana
Museums in Lake County, Indiana